Parliamentary elections were held in Hungary between 13 and 22 June 1884. The result was a victory for the Liberal Party, which won 234 of the 413 seats.

Results

Parliamentary
Elections in Hungary
Hungary
Elections in Austria-Hungary
Hungary

hu:Magyarországi országgyűlési választások a dualizmus korában#1884